Vincent Powell-Smith (28 April 1939 - 14 May 1997) was a British barrister, professor of law and legal author.  He also wrote under the pen names Justiciar and Francis Elphinstone.

Powell-Smith was born in Westerham, Kent, England and died in Kuala Lumpur, Malaysia. He is survived by two daughters, Amanda Jane and Helena Alexia. 
Powell-Smith was buried at St. Mary's Cathedral, Kuala Lumpur, on 15 May 1997.

Works

 The Building Regulations: Explained And Illustrated
 The Building Regulations Explained and Illustrated for Residential Buildings 
 A Building Contract Casebook 
 The Transport Act 1968
 The Law Of Boundaries And Fences
 GC/Works/1: The Government General Conditions of Contract for Building and Civil Engineering
 The Contract Journal Contractor's Guide To The General Conditions Of Government Contracts For Building & Civil Engineering Works
 The Law And Practice Relating To Company Directors
 Contractors' Guide to the JCT Standard Form of Building Contract (1988 Legal Studies & Services Ltd)
 Problems in Construction Claims (1990 BSP Professional Books)
 Casebook On Contract
 Modern View of the Law for Builders and Surveyors
 Contract
 Construction Law Reports: V. 7
 Construction Law Reports: V. 11
 Questions And Answers On "A" Level Law

Co-authored
 Powell-Smith & Furmston's Building Contract Casebook (with M.P. Furmston)(1984; 1987; 1990; 2000 Blackwell Science Ltd)
 The Building Regulations: Explained & Illustrated (with W.S. Whyte, M.J. Billington)
 Means of Escape from Fire (with Alex Copping, Anthony Ferguson, Michael J Billington)
 Civil Engineering Claims (with Douglas Stephenson, John Redmond)(1989 BSP Professional Books)

With John Sims
 Building Contract Claims (1983, 1988 BSP Professional Books)
 Determination And Suspension Of Construction Contracts

With John Sims and Christopher Dancaster
 Construction Arbitrations: A Practical Guide (1989 Legal Studies & Services Ltd)
 Contract Documentation For Contractors

With Jeremy Houghton-Brown
 Horse and Stable Management
 Horse Business Management

With David Chappell
 Building Contracts Compared And Tabulated (1986 Architectural Press Ltd; 1989 Legal Studies & Services (Publishing) Ltd)
 Joint Contracts Tribunal Intermediate Form Of Contract: A Practical Guide (1991 Legal Studies & Services (Publishing) Ltd; 1999 Blackwell Science Ltd)
 JCT Intermediate Form of Contract: An Architect's Guide (1985 Architectural Press Ltd)
 Building Contract Claims (also with John Sims 1998, 2005 Blackwell Publishing Ltd)
 JCT Minor Works Form of Contract: An Architect's Guide (1985 Architectural Press Ltd)
 JCT Minor Works Form of Contract: A Practical Guide (1990 Legal Studies & Services (Publishing) Ltd; 1999 Blackwell Science Ltd)
 Building Contract Dictionary  (1985 Architectural Press Ltd; 1990 Legal Studies & Services (Publishing) Ltd)
 Engineering Contract Dictionary (also with Derek Simmonds) (1989 Legal Studies & Services (Publishing) Ltd)
 The JCT Design and Build Contract (1993 Blackwell Scientific Publications; 1999 Blackwell Science Ltd)
 Building Sub-Contract Documentation (1994 Blackwell Scientific Publications)

Legacy
 The Vincent Powell-Smith Prize Essay Writing Competition is presented by The Malaysian Society of Construction Law

References

External links
 The Chivalric Succession

British writers
20th-century English lawyers
1939 births
1997 deaths